The Eastside is an urban region in Los Angeles County, California. It includes the Los Angeles City neighborhoods east of the Los Angeles River — that is, Boyle Heights, El Sereno, and Lincoln Heights — as well as unincorporated East Los Angeles.

History

East Los Angeles was founded in 1870 by John Strother Griffin (1816–1898), who was called "the father of East Los Angeles". He was said to have created the first suburb of the city of Los Angeles in Lincoln Heights after he purchased 2,000 acres of ranch land for $1,000 and in 1870, with his nephew, Hancock Johnson, erected houses on the site. That land was a rancho called La Rosa de Castilla, on the east side of the Los Angeles River, taking in the deserted hills between Los Angeles and Pasadena. In late 1874 the two men offered an additional thirty-five acres, divided into 65x165-foot lots, for $150 each. They planned the laying out of streets of the present community of East Los Angeles and gifted East Side Park (the present Lincoln Park) to the city of Los Angeles.

The Mapping L.A. project of the Los Angeles Times defines the Eastside as comprising Boyle Heights, El Sereno, Lincoln Heights, and East Los Angeles.  However, the boundaries are a matter of perennial discussion and debate among the residents of Los Angeles.

The Mapping L.A. definition corresponds to the traditional boundaries, but, beginning in the early 21st century, residents of some of the rapidly gentrifying neighborhoods west of Downtown Los Angeles but on the eastern side of Central Los Angeles, such as Echo Park and Silver Lake, began to refer to their neighborhoods as part of the Eastside.  This debate generated some friction, which, according to Ali Modarres, an expert on the geography of Los Angeles from the University of Washington Tacoma, is to be expected because neighborhood names are "full of meaning, nuances, history, cultural and political relationships". Eric Garcetti, the mayor of Los Angeles and a fourth generation resident, is a traditionalist, stating that "true east is east of downtown".

The trend led the Silver Lake Neighborhood Council to declare officially in February 2014 that Silver Lake is not part of the Eastside.

The Sixth Street Viaduct, also known as the Sixth Street Bridge was demolished. Prior to the demolition, Los Angeles mayor Eric Garcetti recorded the rap song "101SlowJam", backed by musicians from Roosevelt High School, and issued it via a video on his own YouTube channel. The public service announcement video advertised the closure of parts of the 101 Freeway to accommodate the demolition of the viaduct.

Communities

City of Los Angeles
The official East Area Planning Commission area of the City of Los Angeles is divided into the following communities:
Boyle Heights
Lincoln Heights
El Sereno
Northeast Los Angeles
Atwater Village
Cypress Park
Eagle Rock
Garvanza
Glassell Park
Hermon
Highland Park
Montecito Heights
Mount Washington
Rose Hills
Silver Lake–Echo Park–Elysian Valley

Mapping L.A.

The Mapping L.A. project by the Los Angeles Times lists the following City of Los Angeles neighborhoods in its definition of the Eastside:
Boyle Heights
El Sereno
Lincoln Heights

Education

Population and housing
The following data applies to the boundaries of the Eastside established by Mapping L.A.:

In 2000, 286,222 people lived in the 20.66 square miles of the Eastside region,  amounting to 13,852 people per square mile.
The neighborhood was "not especially diverse" ethnically, with a high percentage of Latinos. The ethnic breakdown was Latino, 91.2%; Asian, 5.2%, white, 2.3%; black, 0.7% and other, 0.6%.  Just 5.1% of residents aged 25 and older had a four-year college degree. More than two-thirds (66.8%) of the inhabitants lived in shared housing, and 33.2% were homeowners.

Notable places

Latino Walk of Fame - East Los Angeles
Mariachi Plaza - Boyle Heights
El Mercado de Los Angeles - Boyle Heights
Calvary Cemetery (Roman Catholic) - East Los Angeles
Home of Peace Cemetery (Jewish) - East Los Angeles
 Evergreen Cemetery - Boyle Heights
Estrada Courts Murals - Boyle Heights
El Pino (The Pine Tree) - East Los Angeles

Notable people

 John Strother Griffin (1816–1898), surgeon, founder of East Los Angeles, member of Los Angeles Common Council
 Dan Peña financial analyst on Wall Street
Herb Alpert, musician, producer
 Narciso Botello (about 1813–1889) Mexican Army officer, California State Assembly member
Anthony Quinn, actor
 Howard E. Dorsey, engineer, politician
Jaime Escalante, educator
Edward James Olmos, actor
Luis J. Rodriguez, writer and activist
Andy Russell, international recording artist
Hope Sandoval, singer-songwriter
will.i.am (William James Adams, Jr.), musician, producer, philanthropist
Oscar De La Hoya, boxer
Kid Frost, musician

Gallery

See also

 My Family/Mi Familia, Motion Picture of life in East Los Angeles
 Born in East L.A., motion picture
   Chicano, ethnic term
 East LA Classic, football game
 Blood In Blood Out, motion picture
 City Times in Los Angeles Times suburban sections
 Zoot Suit Riots, 1943
 Ten Latino neighborhoods in Los Angeles County

Further reading

References

External links

 The Eastsider LA
 
 East LA Guide

 
Los Angeles County, California regions